Darren McCarthy (born 1 November 1963) is an Australian former professional rugby league footballer who primarily played as a .

The teams he played for at a club level were: the South Sydney Rabbitohs (1983−86, 1990−91) and the Canterbury-Bankstown Bulldogs (1987−89).

References

1963 births
Living people
Australian rugby league players
Canterbury-Bankstown Bulldogs players
South Sydney Rabbitohs players
Rugby league centres
Rugby league wingers
Place of birth missing (living people)